Wendy Orent is an American anthropologist and science writer with a focus on pandemics, biological weapons, and the evolution of infectious diseases. She is a freelance science writer whose work has appeared in "The Washington Post", "Aeon", "Undark Magazine", "The Sciences", "The Los Angeles Times", "The New Republic", "Discover", and "The American Prospect".

Life
Orent assisted Russian scientist Igor Domaradskij in the writing of his memoir, Biowarrior: Inside the Soviet/Russian Biological War Machine. Domaradskij credits himself with much of the research leading to the creation of an antibiotic resistant strain of Yersinia pestis, the plague germ. Domaradskij, the co-designer of the entire Soviet biological weapons program known as Biopreparat,  carried out the research leading to the creation of an antibiotic resistant strain of Yersinia pestis, the plague germ. She discussed this in her own book, Plague: The Mysterious Past and Terrifying Future of the World's Most Dangerous Disease.

Orent has also written several articles on the ongoing threat of COVID-19, claiming that the origins of SARS-CoV-2 are most likely to lie in live animal markets than in any sort of laboratory escape from the Wuhan Institute of Virology.

References

Living people
American anthropologists
Year of birth missing (living people)